Rudolf Zwirner (born 1933) is a German art dealer and gallerist.

Early life
He was born in 1933, the son of the phonetician . His brother, (1929-2010) was a doctor.

Career
Together with his wife Ursula Reppin, he opened his first gallery in Essen in 1959. They opened a second gallery in Cologne in 1963.

In 1967, he co-founded the world's first art fair, Art Cologne.

Personal life
He was married to Ursula Reppin (born 1935, Breslau). They had a daughter, Esther, and a son David Zwirner is also an art dealer and gallerist. They divorced in 1974 or 1975, when David was ten, and Zwirner remarried to another Ursula.

He is now married to Dorothea, and they have a daughter, Louisa.

References

1933 births
Living people
German art dealers
Zwirner family